Romantisísmico (Romanticeismic) is the eleventh studio album by Argentine rock band Babasónicos, released in September 2013.

Track listing 
"La lanza" [The spear] (A.Rodríguez, D.Rodríguez)
"Aduana de palabras" [Words Customs] (A.Rodríguez, D.Rodríguez)
"El baile del Odín" [The dance of Odin] (A.Rodríguez, D.Rodríguez, D.Tuñón, M.Dominguez)
"Run Run" (A.Rodríguez, D.Rodríguez, D.Tuñón)
"Los Burócratas del Amor" [The Bureaucrats of Love] (A.Rodríguez, M.Dominguez)
"Negrita" [Bold] (A.Rodríguez, D.Rodríguez, D.Tuñón)
"Uso" [Use] (A.Rodríguez, D.Rodríguez, D.Tuñón)
"Humo" [Smoke] (A.Rodríguez, M.Dominguez)
"Casi" [Nearly] (A.Rodríguez, M.Dominguez)
"Uno tres dos" [One three two] (A.Rodríguez, M.Dominguez)
"Paisano" (A.Rodríguez, D.Rodríguez)
"Celofán" [Cellophane] (A.Rodríguez, D.Rodríguez)

Singles
"La lanza"
"Los Burócratas del Amor"
"Aduana de palabras"

References

2013 albums
Babasónicos albums